Karma to Burn is an American rock band.

Karma to Burn may also refer to:

 Karma to Burn (Karma to Burn album), 1997
 Karma to Burn (The Waterboys album), 2005